Black on Black: A Tribute to Black Flag is a tribute album to the defunct American hardcore punk band Black Flag. The album was originally released through Initial Records on October 8, 2002. After Initial Records went out of business in 2004, Black on Black was later reissued through ReIgnition Recordings on March 14, 2006 with six new cover songs.

Reception

Track listing
All songs originally written and recorded by Black Flag.

Personnel 

John A. – guitar
Kurt Ballou – producer, engineer, mixing
Dean Baltulonis – engineer
Brian Benoit – guitar
Tim Cossar – producer
Demian – backing vocals
John Golden – mastering
Jason Hellmann – photography
Mike Hill – guitar, vocals
The Hope Conspiracy – mixing
Scott C. Kinkade – photography
John McKaig – photography
Mickey O – vocals
Teddy P. – bass
Ryan Patterson – liner notes, layout design
Chris Pennie – drums
Chris Pierce – engineer
Matt Pike – booking
Playing Enemy – producer
Greg Puciato – vocals
Ed Rose – engineer
Josh Scott – bass
Joel Stallings – drums
Ben Weinman – guitar
Liam Wilson – bass
Jacob Bannon - vocals

References

2002 compilation albums
Black Flag (band) tribute albums